Ehirava fluviatilis, or the Malabar sprat, is a species of fish endemic to the rivers and coastal lagoons and estuaries of southern India and Sri Lanka. It is the only recognized species in its genus. It grows to  standard length.

References

Clupeidae
Fish of India
Fish of Sri Lanka
Taxa named by Paulus Edward Pieris Deraniyagala
Fish described in 1929